KTNX may refer to:

 KTNX (FM), a radio station (103.9 FM) licensed to Arcadia, Missouri, United States
 Tonopah Test Range Airport (ICAO code KTNX)